The Death of the Incredible Hulk is a 1990 American television superhero film, the last of three revival films based on the 1978–1982 television series The Incredible Hulk. Bill Bixby reprises his role as Dr. David Banner and Lou Ferrigno returns to play the Hulk. It was filmed in Vancouver, British Columbia, Canada. Prior to Bill Bixby's death in 1993, there was talk of a movie The Revenge of the Incredible Hulk television movie which would resurrect the character.

Plot
David Banner (Bill Bixby) masquerades as David Bellamy, a mentally challenged janitor, to gain access to a scientific research facility in Portland, Oregon. He believes that the studies of one of the scientists there, Dr. Ronald Pratt (Philip Sterling), may hold the key to curing his gamma-induced condition that, in times of stress, turns him into a superhuman green creature known as the Hulk.

One night after making a transaction at the bank, David is trapped by street thieves and is beaten and robbed. The stress of his injuries induces another transformation. The Hulk makes short work of the criminals but attracts the attention of authorities before escaping.

The next day, bypassing security, Banner enters Pratt's laboratory and examines the formula on his blackboard, making corrections. At the same time, an Eastern European spy named Jasmine (Elizabeth Gracen), thinking she has completed her last act of espionage, is approached by former superior Kasha for one last job: infiltrate Pratt's lab and steal the files on his experiments. When she refuses, Kasha blackmails Jasmine with her sister Bella's life. Jasmine then disguises herself and obtains a fingerprint from one of the security guards.

The following morning, Pratt examines the formula on his blackboard and discovers that it is now correct. Determined to find out who is guiding him, he hides in the lab in wait for his secret helper. He catches David in the act and asks him to tell him something that would keep him from sounding the security alarm. Banner reveals his true identity and recounts the events that led to his self-experimentation that resulted in the Hulk. He notes that his condition also dives into Pratt's own research on a human's capacity to heal, for in Hulk-form David's accelerated metabolism allows any wound to close in seconds, leaving him with no scar.

Pratt believes he can cure David, but he needs to first study the creature. Over the course of a week, both scientists, with the help of Pratt's scientist wife Amy (Barbara Tarbuck), construct a force field cage and sensors to track Banner's vitals. On the night of the observation, David is rigged with a tranquilizer to sedate him once the readings have been recorded. Banner shocks himself with an electrical rod and transforms into the Hulk. The energy cage restrains the Hulk until Pratt has his readings, and Amy activates the tranquilizer. Banner reverts to normal, and Pratt and Amy photograph the closing puncture wound from the tranquilizer. Banner later watches the video of his transformation – claiming it is the first time he has seen the Hulk on video– and fails to see any humanity in him despite Amy's beliefs.

The next day, the facility's board announces to Pratt that they are pulling his funding for his lack of results, which forces him to move up his proposed cure for David. An eastern European spy network dedicated to using Pratt's (and Banner's) work for corrupt purposes breaks into the lab, halting the experiment thus transforming Banner into the Hulk again and leaving Dr. Pratt in a coma The Hulk escapes the lab with the lab's security forces coming after him and rips through an electrified fence. While David Banner is pursued by Kasha's men, he encounters Jasmine in a store, during a fight, one of the men, Pauley, is mortally wounded, he then tells Jasmine that her sister Bella is the leader of the spy Network. Banner has fallen in love with Jasmine, who returns his affections. Dr. Pratt and his wife are later kidnapped by Bella while being escorted from the Hospital by Federal Agents Shoup and Luanne Cole. Banner and Jasmine capture one of the kidnappers, Brendan Ashley, and Ashley tells them that Bella is holding the Pratts at an Airfield. The Police, Federal Agents Shoup and Cole launch a raid on the Airfield. Kasha and several henchmen are killed in the attack while Bella and Zed escape in an Airplane.

While pursuing the kidnappers, Banner turns into the Hulk, who tries to protect Pratt and Jasmine. The Hulk runs towards the plane, on which Bella and Zed are attempting to escape, and breaks it open. He climbs aboard before takeoff. Bella tries to shoot the Hulk, but ends up shooting the fuel tank below. As a result, the plane explodes, killing Bella and Zed. The Hulk is thrown onto the concrete. Transforming back to human, Banner tells Jasmine he is free, then succumbs to his injuries. Jasmine, Pratt, and Amy mourn for him.

Cast

Production
This third telefilm was initially announced to feature the Marvel Comics character She-Hulk, just as the previous two had featured Thor and Daredevil. As of early July 1989, it was still firmly expected to do so, and to air that autumn, with Iron Man under consideration for a follow-up.

The movie was filmed between November 1989 and January 1990 in Vancouver.

Canceled sequel
Despite Hulk's death in the 1990 film, the movie's makers had intended from the start for him to return in The Revenge of the Incredible Hulk, again with Gerald Di Pego as writer. As of July 10, 1990, a script was being written. It has been reported that the fourth film would have featured the Hulk with Banner's mind, and that the project was canceled because of Bill Bixby's struggle with cancer, but Di Pego has refuted both these claims as fan rumors, pointing out that Bixby's health had not yet begun to decline at the time the film was canceled. Di Pego said that the plot for The Revenge of the Incredible Hulk began with Banner being revived, but no longer able to change into the Hulk. Banner then begins to work for the government in order to prevent accidents like the one that turned him into the Hulk, but is captured by villains and coerced into turning their agents into Hulk-like beings. According to Di Pego, at the film's climax Banner would be forced to recreate the accident that transformed him into the Hulk in order to stop the villains' plans.

The sequel was canceled because of the disappointing ratings for The Death of the Incredible Hulk.

Home media
This telefilm was originally released on VHS by Rhino Home Video in 1992. It was released on DVD by 20th Century Fox Home Entertainment on June 3, 2003.

See also
The Incredible Hulk Returns (first telefilm) 
The Trial of the Incredible Hulk (second telefilm)

References

External links

Hulk Smash Television!

1990 drama films
1990 television films
1990 films
1990s superhero films
American sequel films
Films based on television series
Films directed by Bill Bixby
Hulk (comics) films
Live-action films based on Marvel Comics
NBC network original films
Television films based on television series
Television series reunion films
The Incredible Hulk (1978 TV series)
1990s English-language films
1990s American films